Holt is a city in Marshall County, Minnesota, United States. The population was 90 at the 2020 census.

Geography

Demographics

2010 census
As of the census of 2010, there were 88 people, 36 households, and 25 families living in the city. The racial makeup of the city was 93.2% White, 1.1% African American, 4.5% Native American, and 1.1% from two or more races. Hispanic or Latino of any race were 1.1% of the population.

There were 36 households, of which 33.3% had children under the age of 18 living with them, 61.1% were married couples living together, 5.6% had a female householder with no husband present, 2.8% had a male householder with no wife present, and 30.6% were non-families. 25.0% of all households were made up of individuals, and 11.1% had someone living alone who was 65 years of age or older. The average household size was 2.44 and the average family size was 3.00.

The median age in the city was 37.7 years. 27.3% of residents were under the age of 18; 1.1% were between the ages of 18 and 24; 31.9% were from 25 to 44; 28.4% were from 45 to 64; and 11.4% were 65 years of age or older. The gender makeup of the city was 53.4% male and 46.6% female.

2000 census
As of the census of 2000, there were 89 people, 36 households, and 25 families living in the city. The racial makeup of the city was 97.75% White, 1.12% Native American and 1.12% Asian.

There were 36 households, out of which 27.8% had children under the age of 18 living with them, 72.2% were married couples living together, and 27.8% were non-families. 22.2% of all households were made up of individuals, and 2.8% had someone living alone who was 65 years of age or older. The average household size was 2.47 and the average family size was 2.92.

In the city, the population was spread out, with 16.9% under the age of 18, 21.3% from 18 to 24, 33.7% from 25 to 44, 20.2% from 45 to 64, and 7.9% who were 65 years of age or older. The median age was 34 years. For every 100 females, there were 140.5 males. For every 100 females age 18 and over, there were 146.7 males.

The median income for a household in the city was $32,500, and the median income for a family was $36,250. Males had a median income of $22,188 versus $16,250 for females. The per capita income for the city was $14,796. There were 13.0% of families and 8.8% of the population living below the poverty line, including no under eighteens and 50.0% of those over 64.

References

Cities in Minnesota
Cities in Marshall County, Minnesota